is a wargame developed by Nintendo and Intelligent Systems and published by Nintendo for the Famicom. It was released on August 12, 1988  in Japan. It was later re-released on Virtual Console. It is the first game in the Wars series.

Gameplay

Players take control of one of two warring nations, Red Star and Blue Moon, as they seek to establish turn-based dominance over each other. After selecting which stage to start the game and setting which, if either, player will be controlled by a person, the Red Star army is given the first turn. The objective in each stage is to either capture the enemy's headquarters or destroy all remaining enemy units in one turn. During each turn, the player is given a certain amount of funds which can be used to build units in factories, seaports, and airports under their command; additional funds are earned by conquering cities near their headquarters. Each unit has their own speciality and unique abilities, with ten land units (including two foot soldier units), four air units, and two sea units. Some units have heavier firepower than others, while others provide support to allies. Only foot soldier units are capable of conquering cities, which can then be used to repair or refuel damaged units. There are 15 maps available at the start of the game, with two secret ending maps dependent on which nation the player fights for when playing against the computer.

Development
Development of Famicom Wars began as Intelligent Systems changed its direction from creating hardware to developing simulation games.

Reception and legacy
On release, Famicom Tsūshin (now Famitsu) scored the Famicom version of the game a 33 out of 40. The 1989 "All Soft Catalog" issue of Famicom Tsūshin included Famicom Wars in its list of the best games of all time, giving it the Best Simulation and Best Commercial awards.

The original Famicom Wars was followed by a series of sequels which were released only in Japan as well, which includes Game Boy Wars in 1990 and Super Famicom Wars in 1998, both which were developed by Intelligent Systems and Nintendo, as opposed to a sub-series of sequels to the original Game Boy Wars, which were developed and published by Hudson Soft. The series eventually made its international debut with Advance Wars, released for the Game Boy Advance in 2001. The maps from both Famicom Wars and Super Famicom Wars were later included in Advance Wars and its sequels.

A group of six soldiers from the game appears in the Wii game Captain Rainbow. The soldiers aspire to win the volleyball gold medal.

Super Famicom Wars 

Super Famicom Wars is an enhanced remake of Famicom Wars developed by Intelligent Systems and released for the Super Famicom on May 1, 1998 exclusively via the Nintendo Power service in commemoration of the tenth anniversary of the original Famicom version. Improvements over the original Famicom Wars include the inclusion of 8 new types of units in addition to the 16 original units, a faster decision-making process for the CPU, the introduction of Reconnaissance Mode (also known as "Fog of War" mode in later localizations, in which enemy units are invisible during the player's turn when they're not in proximity to the player's units) and the maximum amount of deployed units being increased from 48 to 60 units. In addition to the original campaign between the Red Star and Blue Moon armies, there's a new campaign also consisting of 17 maps involving two new factions, Green Earth and Yellow Comet, as well as a 4-players mode consisting of 10 maps involving all four factions, for a total of 44 maps. The player can also assign one of seven generals to each army, which mainly affects what kind of strategies the CPU will employ, although some of the generals do provide passive benefits even when assigned to a player-controlled faction. The game was digitally released on Nintendo's Japanese Virtual Console for Wii, Wii U, and 3DS platforms. An English-language fan translation was released in 2018.

Notes

References

External links
Famicom Wars at Japanese Virtual Console site 
Famicom Wars at NinDB

1988 video games
Computer wargames
Wars (series)
Japan-exclusive video games
Naval video games
Nintendo Entertainment System games
Turn-based tactics video games
Virtual Console games
Virtual Console games for Wii U
Video games developed in Japan
Video games scored by Hirokazu Tanaka
Video games scored by Kenji Yamamoto (composer, born 1964)
Single-player video games
Nintendo Switch Online games